The Portfolio Committee on International Relations and Cooperation is a portfolio committee in the National Assembly of South Africa that focuses on the Department of International Relations and Cooperation as well as the African Renaissance and International Cooperation Fund.

As of August 2021, Supra Mahumapelo of the African National Congress serves as Chair of the Committee.

Membership
The committee consists of 11 members: six from the African National Congress, two from the Democratic Alliance, one from the Economic Freedom Fighters and two members from other parties. As of December 2020, the committee's current members are as follows:

The following people serve as alternate members:

See also
Committees of the Parliament of South Africa

References

Committees of the National Assembly of South Africa
Parliamentary committees on Foreign Affairs